Cangzhou station is a station on the conventional Beijing–Shanghai railway in the city of Cangzhou, Hebei.

Stations on the Beijing–Shanghai Railway
Railway stations in Hebei